Harry Gilbey was a British actor who appeared in more than fifty films during the silent era including After Dark (1915).

Selected filmography
 The Vicar of Wakefield (1913)
 Kissing Cup (1913)
 After Dark (1915)
 Barnaby Rudge (1915)
 The House of Fortescue (1916)
 The Man Behind 'The Times' (1917)
 The Eternal Triangle (1917)
 Broken Threads (1917)
 With All Her Heart (1920)
 The Adventures of Mr. Pickwick (1921)
 Sybil (1921)

References

Bibliography
 Goble, Alan. The Complete Index to Literary Sources in Film. Walter de Gruyter, 1999.

External links

Year of birth unknown
Year of death unknown
British male film actors
Place of death missing
Place of birth missing